The Simonini Mini 2 Evo is an Italian aircraft engine, designed and produced by Simonini Racing of San Dalmazio di Serramazzoni for use in ultralight aircraft.

Design and development
The Mini 2 Evo is a single cylinder two-stroke, air-cooled, gasoline engine design, with a poly V belt reduction drive with reduction ratios of 2.3:1 or 3.0:1. It employs capacitor discharge ignition and produces  at 8000 rpm.

Applications
Paraavis Vityaz

Specifications (Mini 2 Evo)

See also

References

External links

Air-cooled aircraft piston engines
Simonini aircraft engines
Two-stroke aircraft piston engines